The Meril International Tournament was a One Day International cricket tournament played by Bangladesh, Kenya and Zimbabwe. The tournament was held in Bangladesh from 19 March to 27 March 1999. Zimbabwe defeated Kenya by 202 runs in the final to win the tournament.

Squads

Matches

Group stage

Final

References

External links

1999 in Bangladeshi cricket
International cricket competitions from 1997–98 to 2000